The 2000–01 Pacific-10 Conference men's basketball season ended with five teams participating in the 2001 NCAA Division I men's basketball tournament.

The Stanford Cardinal won the regular season championship.

Only three teams, Stanford (#2), Arizona (#4), and UCLA (#18), finished the season in the Coaches Poll. They were #2, #5, and #15 respectively in the "AP Top 25" poll. However, in the final post-NCAA tournament coaches' poll, USC was also ranked, coming in at #14, behind Arizona (#2), Stanford (#5) and UCLA (#12).

Postseason
Five Pac-10 teams participated in the 2001 NCAA Men's Division I Basketball Tournament. Four teams (Stanford, Arizona, UCLA, USC) all advanced to the Sweet 16, with Stanford making it to the Elite 8. Arizona made it all the way to the national championship game, losing to Duke, 82-72

Awards and honors

Player/Coach of the Year
 Player of The Year: Sean Lampley, 
 Freshman of The Year: Luke Ridnour, 
 Coach of The Year: Steve Lavin, UCLA

All-Pac-10 Team

References